Richard Carlyle (March 20, 1914 – November 15, 2009) was a film, television and Broadway actor.

Early years
Carlyle was born in St. Catharines, Ontario, Canada. His education included attendance at Sherwood Dramatic Art School and the Art Institute of Chicago.

Career
Carlyle's early work on stage came with the troupe at the Barter Theatre and in stock theatre in Springfield, Illinois.

On television, Carlyle co-starred in "The Long Walk", the May 30, 1950, episode of Cameo Theatre. In 1951, Carlyle starred as Jack Casey in the television version of Casey, Crime Photographer on CBS.

He had a prolific career beginning in the 1950s appearing in a variety of theatre productions and as a character actor on numerous television series.  He played Rezin Bowie in The Iron Mistress (1952) and Commander Don Adams in the Oscar-nominated war drama Torpedo Run (1959) starring Glenn Ford. He also had a long tenure with Theatre West in Los Angeles.

In the original Star Trek series he played Lt. Karl Jaeger in "The Squire of Gothos" (1967).

Death
On November 15, 2009, Carlyle died in Los Angeles.

Filmography

References 
NotesCitations'''

External links
 

1914 births
2009 deaths
American male film actors
American male stage actors
American male television actors
20th-century Canadian male actors
Canadian male film actors
Canadian male stage actors
Canadian male television actors
Canadian emigrants to the United States
20th-century American male actors